Pescara Jazz is an international jazz festival that takes place every year in July in Pescara, Abruzzo, Italy.

When it started in 1969 it was the first Italian summer festival dedicated to jazz. Since 1981, the festival has take place every year. Performers have included Dave Brubeck, Natalie Cole, Chick Corea, Miles Davis, Duke Ellington, Bill Evans, Ella Fitzgerald, Stan Getz, Dizzie Gillespie, Herbie Hancock, Woody Herman, Wynton Marsalis, Pat Metheny, Charles Mingus, Oscar Peterson, Wayne Shorter, and Sarah Vaughan.

References

External links 
 
 Jazz musician Larry Vuckovich talks about performing at the first Pescara Jazz in 1969

Jazz festivals in Italy
Music festivals established in 1969
Pescara
Tourist attractions in Abruzzo
1969 establishments in Italy